Chittagong University Railway Station is situated next to Shahid Amoo Road in Hathazari, Chittagong, Bangladesh. It was built so that students of Chittagong University can travel to their university easily. It has one platform.

University Shuttle Train

The University Shuttle Train is a unique quality of this University. This train operated by Bangladesh Railway eastern division and monitored by university authority. Everyday thousands of students come for classes and return to their home through this train. As per the new schedule, CU-bound trains will leave Chattogram railway station at 7:30am, 8:00am, 3:50pm, 5:30pm, and 8:30pm while they will leave from Sholoshohor railway station at 9:45am and 10:30am.
Besides, city-bound trains will leave Chittagong University railway station at 8:45am, 9:20am, 2:30pm, 3:30pm, 5:00pm, 6:00pm and 9.30pm.

Gallery

See more
 University of Chittagong
 List of railway stations in Bangladesh

References

University of Chittagong
Railway stations at university and college campuses
Railway stations in Chittagong District